Bradbury Wilkinson & Co were an English engraver and printer of banknotes, postage stamps and share certificates.

History
The original company was established in the 1850s by Henry Bradbury and begun printing banknotes in 1856.  Bradbury then died in 1860.  In 1873–74, the firm built an imposing six-storey workshop, for engraving printing plates, in Holborn, London at 25 and 27 Farringdon Road, which is now a Grade II-listed building.

The company printed the first series of the Imperial Bank of Persia banknotes that were issued in 1890.

In 1903, the company was acquired by the American Bank Note Company. In 1917, it moved to New Malden in Surrey still operating as Bradbury-Wilkinson as a wholly owned subsidiary of ABNC.

In 1983, Bradbury Wilkinson created a form of polymer banknote using Du Pont's Tyvek material; this was marketed as Bradvek and used to print 1-pound banknotes for the Isle of Man. In 1986 the company was acquired by De La Rue. The site is now occupied by the Shannon Corner Tesco supermarket.  The last Bradbury Wilkinson plant was shut down by De La Rue in 1990.

In 2015 a Seychelles 50 rupee banknote (worth £2.50 or $4), originally issued between 1968 and 1973, featuring Queen Elizabeth II and covertly depicting the word "sex", was sold at auction in the UK for £336 (around $500). Many think Bradbury Wilkinson's engraver Brian Fox put it in.

References 

 
 

Manufacturing companies of the United Kingdom
Bradbury
Currency designers
Banknote printing companies